is the fourth studio album by Japanese pop rock band, Scandal. The album was released on September 26, 2012 by Epic. It is available in three different editions, a limited CD+DVD version, a regular CD Only version, and a limited CD+Photobook edition. The album reached #4 on the Oricon weekly charts and charted for 12 weeks.

"Welcome home" was used as the theme song for the TV program Mizu to Midori no Campaign.

Track listing

Personnel
HARUNA (Haruna Ono) - lead vocals, rhythm guitar
MAMI (Mami Sasazaki) - lead guitar, lead vocals on track 7, backing vocals
TOMOMI (Tomomi Ogawa) - bass, lead and backing vocals
RINA (Rina Suzuki) - drums, backing vocals

Guest musicians
Yoshio Nomura - lead guitar on track 1
Yūzō Ōkusu - synthesizer
Hirohito Furui - synthesizer
Akira Onozuka - piano
Kazuta Katsuki - saxophone
Watanabe Fire - saxophone
Shin Kazuhara - trumpet
Sirō Sasaki - trumpet
Azusa Tōjō - trombone
Matarō Misawa - percussions
Yuki Okazaki - chorus
Yūichi Ikusawa - chorus

References 

2012 albums
Japanese-language albums
Scandal (Japanese band) albums
Epic Records albums